In mathematics, an admissible algebra is a (possibly non-associative) commutative algebra whose enveloping Lie algebra of derivations splits into the sum of an even and an odd part.

References

Non-associative algebra